Gerard Jirair Libaridian (born 1945 in Beirut, Lebanon) is an Armenian American historian and politician.

Biography
From 1991 to 1997, he served as adviser, and then senior adviser to the former President of Armenia, Levon Ter-Petrosyan, and was closely involved in the Karabakh negotiations. In 2007, Libaridian was appointed the Director of Armenian Studies Program at the University of Michigan. He holds the Alex Manoogian Chair in Modern Armenian History at the University of Michigan. He has provided occasional commentary on relations between Armenia, Azerbaijan and Turkey, including on the 2020 Nagorno-Karabakh war. In 2012, he had warned that Armenia would "remain weak" if it did not settle the Karabakh conflict.

In 1995 the Commission on Security and Cooperation in Europe wrote that Libaridian had been a member of the Armenian Revolutionary Federation (ARF) for 25 years and was "intimately acquainted with its structure and methods."

Selected works 
 1984 (as editor): What Is to Be Asked?, ed., Proceedings of Colloquium, Zoryan Institute, Cambridge, Mass.
1985 (as editor): A Crime of Silence. The Armenian Genocide. Zed Books, 
1988 (as editor) The Karabagh File. Documents and Facts, 1918-1988 (ed.). Zoryan Institute, Cambridge and Toronto
1990 (as editor) The Sumgait Tragedy: Pogroms Against Armenians in Soviet Azerbaijan, Caratzas and Zoryan Institute
 1991: (as editor) Armenia at the Crossroads: Democracy and Nationhood in the Post-Soviet Era: Essays, interviews, and speeches by the leaders of the national democratic movement in Armenia. Blue Crane Books (Watertown, Massachusetts), 
1999: The Challenge of Statehood. Armenian Political Thinking since Independence
2006 (as editor) Demokratizatsiya (Washington, DC)
 2007: Modern Armenia: People, Nation, State. Transaction Publishers (New Brunswick, New Jersey),

References

1945 births
American people of Armenian descent
Lebanese people of Armenian descent
Living people
Politicians from Beirut
University of Michigan faculty